Princess Sela (active  400–420 A.D.) was a Norwegian pirate and one of the first known female pirates. Sela was a princess of Norway and the sister of the King Koller of Norway. The Danish historian Saxo Grammaticus described Sela as a "skilled warrior and experienced in rowing."

Stories say that Sela and her brother hated each other and when Koller became King, Sela decided to become a pirate. She attacked many ships in the North Atlantic ocean, amassing a reputation and a substantial amount of treasure.

Princess Sela's brother King Koller, decided that his rival, Horwendill, the former King of Jutland who turned to piracy, was receiving too much glory and had to be killed. Koller led his fleet into battle with Horwendil. Horwendil then killed Koller, and then later had to kill Sela, to end the war.

Princess Sela was active as a pirate from 400 A.D. to 420 A.D.

See also 

 Women in piracy

References 

Female sailors
Norwegian pirates
Norwegian princesses
Norwegian female pirates
Women in medieval European warfare